"Midsummer Day" is a song by Canadian rock band The Tea Party. It was released as a promotional single in Canada.

Track listing 
"Midsummer Day"
"Midsummer Day (edit)"

References 

1994 singles
The Tea Party songs
1993 songs